Hollym is a publishing house with offices in Seoul, South Korea and California, United States.

History
Hollym was first founded by Lim In Soo(林仁秀) in the Jongno district in Seoul on January 18, 1963.
The company was formerly based in New Jersey. The US company has been publishing books on Korea and Korea-related topics since 1977. The CEO is Ham Ki-man. The company is divided between Hollym's international branch, which handles US publishing and international distribution, and the Korea-based Hollym branch. The Korean corporation was founded in 1963.

Hollym publishes books on Korean art, cooking, fiction (including short stories), language, religion and philosophy, social sciences, sports, and travel.

See also
Korean studies

References

External links
Hollym International website
Hollym Korea website

Book publishing companies of South Korea
Book publishing companies based in California
Book publishing companies based in Seoul
Publishing companies established in 1963
Mass media in Seoul